"Merry Christmas, Charlie Manson!" is the sixteenth episode of the second season of the American animated television series South Park. The 29th episode of the series overall it originally aired on Comedy Central in the United States on December 9, 1998. The episode was written by series co-creator Trey Parker along with Nancy M. Pimental and directed by Eric Stough.

In the episode, the boys go to Cartman's grandma's house in Nebraska for the holidays but Stan was told by his parents that he cannot go because it’s far away from South Park. Stan challenges their authority and goes anyway. Meanwhile Cartman's Uncle Howard and his friend Charlie Manson bust out of prison and cause mayhem and mischief.

Plot
Stan asks his parents for permission to see Cartman's grandma in Nebraska for the holidays but they refuse because this place is far away from South Park. Stan's parents forbid their son to go there and order him to stay with their family for the holidays but he argues with them about it and gets sent to his room without dinner. Angry Stan sneaks out to Cartman's grandma's house just in time to join the other boys. During the drive to Nebraska they see a sign for an appearance of Mr. Hankey at a mall. When they finally arrive, Cartman's relatives are there, all of whom share Cartman's mannerisms. At dinner they meet Cartman's Uncle Howard, live via satellite from the state prison. Later that night the boys hear someone breaking into the house and discover that it is Uncle Howard and another inmate Charlie Manson.

The boys want to go to the mall to see Mr. Hankey, but no one in the family will take them and Cartman is asked to keep an eye on his cousin, Elvin. Manson offers to take the boys to the mall. Kyle and Stan meet a human-sized Mr. Hankey whom Kyle exposes as a fake causing a riot. The boys and Manson escape from the mall but when the riot police recognize Manson, they get into a televised high speed chase with the police. Meanwhile the Marsh family realizes Stan has run away and head out to Nebraska to find him.

Manson arrives at Cartman's grandma's house and together with Uncle Howard proceeds to hold everyone hostage. Stan's parents arrive and Sharon scolds him for disobeying their order to not go to Cartman's grandma's house in Nebraska and for leaving his house without their permission. Stan asks to make an escape with Uncle Howard and Manson but Manson talks to him about the meaning of family which makes him change his mind. Manson and Uncle Howard surrender and sing a holiday-special style song. Stan's parents agree that they were unreasonable when denying him a Christmas with his friends and they will punish him after the holidays. Later as Manson goes to sleep in prison Stan, Kyle and all of the Cartmans appear to sing "Hark! The Herald Angels Sing" to Manson. Afterwards Stan tells Kyle how messed up the events of the episode were.

Home media
All 18 episodes of the second season, including "Merry Christmas, Charlie Manson!", were released on a DVD box set on June 3, 2003.

References

External links

 "Merry Christmas, Charlie Manson!" Full episode at South Park Studios 
 

1998 American television episodes
American Christmas television episodes
Cultural depictions of Charles Manson
Television episodes set in Nebraska
South Park (season 2) episodes